Vendor Bid Analysis (Vendor analysis) is a technique used to figure out the cost of a project by comparing the bids submitted  by many suppliers. This can be accomplished by considering the costs (via quotes, bids, proposals, etc.) presented for project work. By using a selection criteria divided into categories, vendor proposals have to meet these criteria or may be eliminated.

Evaluating Bids  
While analyzing the bids of a product or service, the buying side may consider the following:
 Records from previous deals
 Meeting with quality needs
 Seller capacity and resources
 Meeting deadlines in records
 Financial capability

See also 
 Construction bidding
 Design–bid–build
 Cost estimate

References

External links 
 Vendor Analysis – Picking The Best Vendor